Peter A. Schmidt is an American dairy farmer and Republican politician from the U.S. state of Wisconsin.  He is a member of the Wisconsin State Assembly, representing Wisconsin's 6th Assembly district since January 2023.

Biography
Peter Schmidt was born in Shawano County, Wisconsin, graduated from St. Paul Lutheran School, and earned his bachelor's degree from the University of Wisconsin–Stevens Point.  He is a co-owner of his family farm, the Schmidt Ponderosa farm, which maintains a herd of 1,600 dairy cows.

He has been a member of the Shawano County board of supervisors and the planning commission for the town of Hartland.

Political career
In 2021, Wisconsin State Assembly incumbent Gary Tauchen announced he would not seek re-election in the 2022 election.  Schmidt was one of six who sought the Republican nomination to succeed Tauchen.  Schmidt ultimately prevailed in the primary by just 63 votes, but soon came under intense controversy.  Days after the primary, it was revealed that Schmidt had been the victim of a blackmail attempt by a worker on his family farm, who had a video of Schmidt performing oral sex on another man.  The same week, another story came to light in which Schmidt had been charged with a felony for choking another worker on his farm, but had plead down to a misdemeanor.  

The controversies caused the Shawano County Republican Party to censure Schmidt and coalesce around a write-in campaign for his Republican primary rival, businessman Dean Neubert.  The censure was backed by Republican county officeholders, including the  district attorney, sheriff, and clerk of courts, who all said they could not support Schmidt.  Many who signed the censure even suggested they would support the Democratic candidate if there were no Republican write-in campaign. 

Despite the controversies and the write-in campaign, the district's heavy Republican tilt, created by Wisconsin's strong Republican gerrymander, allowed Schmidt to easily prevail in the general election with 55% of the vote.

Electoral history

Wisconsin Assembly (2022)

| colspan="6" style="text-align:center;background-color: #e9e9e9;"| Republican Primary, August 9, 2022

| colspan="6" style="text-align:center;background-color: #e9e9e9;"| General Election, November 8, 2022

References

External links
 Campaign website
 Peter Schmidt at Wisconsin Vote
 

Living people
Year of birth missing (living people)
People from Shawano County, Wisconsin
Republican Party members of the Wisconsin State Assembly
21st-century American politicians
Farmers from Wisconsin
University of Wisconsin–Stevens Point alumni